Giovanni (Gian) Giacomo Teodoro Trivulzio (1597 – 3 August  1656) was an Italian Cardinal who held several high functions in service of the Spanish Crown.

Trivulzio was born and died in Milan, Duchy of Milan. He was the son of Carlo Emanuele Teodoro Trivulzio, Count of Melzo, who died when Gian Giacomo was still very young, and Catherina Gonzaga. His sister was Ippolita Trivulzio.

In 1615 he married Giovanna Maria Grimaldi, daughter of Hercule, Lord of Monaco.
They had two daughters and one son: 

 Ottavia,
 Caterina,
 Ercole Teodoro, Knight in the Order of the Golden Fleece.

When his wife died in 1620, Gian Giacomo entered the Church. In 1629, he became cardinal.
In 1642 he became Viceroy of Aragon, and Grandee of Spain. 

He participated in the Papal conclave, 1644, which finally chose Pope Innocent X, and in the Papal conclave, 1655, which elected Pope Alexander VII, and where Gian Giacomo as protodeacon gave the Habemus Papam announcement. 

Between 1647 and 1649 he was Viceroy of Sicily and between 1649 and 1651 Viceroy of Sardinia. In April 1656 he became interim Governor of the Duchy of Milan, a post he held until his death. 
He died in Milan on 3 August 1656 and was buried in the family vault in the Santo Stefano church.

Works

Ancestors

External links
 The Cardinals of the Holy Roman Church, Biographical Dictionary, Pope Urban VIII (1623-1644), Consistory of November 19, 1629 (V) 
 

Viceroys of Sicily
Viceroys of Aragon
Viceroys of Sardinia
Governors of the Duchy of Milan
17th-century Italian cardinals
Grandees of Spain
1597 births
1656 deaths
House of Gonzaga
Cardinals created by Pope Urban VIII